Steam was an American pop rock music group, best known for their 1969 number one hit single, "Na Na Hey Hey Kiss Him Goodbye". The song was written and recorded by studio musicians Gary DeCarlo (aka Garrett Scott), Dale Frashuer, and producer/writer Paul Leka at Mercury Records studios in New York City. The single was attributed to the band Steam, although at the time there was actually no band with that name. Leka and the studio group also recorded the first album of the band from which four other songs were released as singles in 1970.

History

Background
In the early 1960s, Frashuer and DeCarlo (born Gary Richard DeCarlo in Bridgeport, Connecticut on June 5, 1942) were members of a doo-wop group from Bridgeport, Connecticut variously known as the Glenwoods, the Citations, and the Chateaus, for which Leka played piano.  The group separated but kept in contact. Leka became a songwriter with Circle Five Productions and in 1967, he wrote and produced the Lemon Pipers' "Green Tambourine" and other Pipers songs with Shelley Pinz.

Steam
In 1969, Leka was working at Mercury Records and convinced the label's A&R to record DeCarlo. With Leka producing, DeCarlo (under the professional name Garrett Scott) recorded four singles, all of which Bob Reno, the label's head, thought would do well issued as an A-side. DeCarlo's first single was to be "Workin' On a Groovy Thing", but it was beaten by the 5th Dimension version released a week earlier. Then the company and Leka decided on "Sweet Laura Lee" as the next single and a B-side was needed. DeCarlo and Leka were asked to cut a B-side along with Frashuer. The trio chose to use a previously unrecorded song from their Chateaus days, which became "Na Na Hey Hey Kiss Him Goodbye".

To the musicians' surprise, Reno decided that "Na Na Hey Hey Kiss Him Goodbye" should be an A-side. Leka thought the song was "an embarrassing record... Not that Gary sang it badly. But compared to his four songs, it was an insult." To avoid a clash with DeCarlo's planned solo career, Mercury issued the single on its Fontana subsidiary under the name "Steam". Leka said the name was conceived after he saw steam rising from a manhole cover in the street outside the recording studio.

Released late in 1969, "Na Na Hey Hey Kiss Him Goodbye" reached number one in the United States for two weeks in December 1969.  The song was also a Top 10 hit in the UK and Canada.

Leka hastily put together a touring group to support the hit single, none of whose members had actually played on the recording. The touring group consisted of: Bill Steer (vocals), Jay Babina and Tom Zuke (guitars), Mike Daniels (bass), Hank Schorz (keyboard), and Ray Corriea (drums). Leka, DeCarlo, and Frashuer did not take part in the touring group, although the three were credited as songwriters for Steam's self-titled album. The second single from the album, "I've Gotta Make You Love Me", reached number 46 in the U.S. on Billboard and 44 in Canada in February 1970.

Later years
Frashuer stepped out of the public eye. He died in 1998 at age 59. Leka became a successful songwriter and producer before his death in 2011. DeCarlo, whose solo career as Garrett Scott did not achieve chart success, left the music industry until making a comeback in 2014, performing at oldies shows.

By the beginning of the 21st century, sales of "Na Na Hey Hey Kiss Him Goodbye" had exceeded 6.5 million records. In 1977, Nancy Faust, the organist for the Chicago White Sox began playing the song to taunt the visiting team. Since then it has been used across the worlds of sport (particularly in relation to player ejections and strutting post-victory celebrations) and politics (at rallies to mock political opponents).

In 2014, DeCarlo released the album Long Time Comin, which included a new version of his hit.

He died on June 28, 2017, after a battle with lung cancer, twenty-three days after his 75th birthday.

Musicians
Key musicians on the record, "Na Na Hey Hey Kiss Him Goodbye"
Paul Leka: Producer, co-writer, keyboards (died 2011)
Dale Frashuer: co-writer (died 1998)
Gary DeCarlo: (as "Garrett Scott") co-writer, lead vocalist and percussion (died 2017)Touring musicians who performed as “Steam”':
Bill Steer: vocals
Jay Babina: guitar 
Tom Zuke: guitar
Mike Daniels: bass
Hank Schorz: keyboard
Ray Correia: drums

Notes:

Discography

Album

Singles

See also
List of one-hit wonders on the UK Singles Chart
List of one-hit wonders in the United States

References

External links
 Steam's Gary DeCarlo Dead at 75 (LiteFavorites.com)
 

American pop rock music groups
Fontana Records artists
Mercury Records artists
Musical groups from New York City